Koba Narchemashvili (born 20 December 1969, Kutaisi, Georgia) is a Georgian politician. Minister of Internal Affairs of Georgia (November 1, 2001 – November 25, 2003), Lieutenant General of Police. He is member of the 9th convocation of Parliament of Georgia; Member of the Committee on Defense and Security.

References

Living people
Members of the Parliament of Georgia
21st-century politicians from Georgia (country)
People from Kutaisi
politicians from Kutaisi
1969 births